Arthrobacter agilis is a psychrotrophic bacterium species from the genus of Arthrobacter which occurs in lake water and Antarctic sea ice. Arthrobacter agilis produces dimethylhexadecylamine and carotenoid.

Arthrobacter agilis is a plant growth promoting and cold active hydrolytic enzymes producing psychrotrophic bacterium, isolated from Pangong Lake, a subglacial lake in north western Himalayas, India. Genome analysis revealed metabolic versatility with genes involved in metabolism and cold shock adaptation, utilization and biosynthesis of diverse structural and storage polysaccharides such as plant based carbon polymers. The genome of Arthrobacter agilis strain L77 consists of 3,608,439 bp (3.60 Mb) of a circular chromosome. The genome comprises 3316 protein coding genes and 74 RNA genes, 725 hypothetical proteins, 25 pseudo-genes and 1404 unique genes. The candidate genes coding for hydrolytic enzymes and cold shock proteins were identified in the genome. Arthrobacter agilis strain L77 will serve as a source for antifreeze proteins, functional enzymes and other bioactive molecules in future bioprospecting projects.

References

Further reading

External links
Type strain of Arthrobacter agilis at BacDive -  the Bacterial Diversity Metadatabase

Bacteria described in 1995
Psychrophiles
Micrococcaceae